The 1992 Newsweek Champions Cup and the Matrix Essentials Evert Cup were tennis tournaments played on outdoor hard courts. It was the 19th edition of the tournament, and was part of the ATP Super 9 of the 1992 ATP Tour, and of the Tier II Series of the 1992 WTA Tour.  It was held from March 2 through March 16, 1992.

Finals

Men's singles

 Michael Chang defeated  Andrei Chesnokov, 6–3, 6–4, 7–5
It was Chang's 1st title of the year and his 7th overall. It was his 1st Masters title of the year and his 2nd overall.

Women's singles

 Monica Seles defeated  Conchita Martínez, 6–3, 6–1
It was Seles' 23rd title overall.

Men's doubles

 Steve DeVries /  David MacPherson defeated  Kent Kinnear /  Sven Salumaa, 4–6, 6–3, 6–3

Women's doubles

 Claudia Kohde-Kilsch /  Stephanie Rehe defeated  Jill Hetherington /  Kathy Rinaldi, 6–3, 6–3

References

External links
 
 Association of Tennis Professionals (ATP) tournament profile

 
1992 Newsweek Champions Cup and the Matrix Essentials Evert Cup
Newsweek Champions Cup And The Matrix Essentials Evert Cup
Newsweek Champions Cup And The Matrix Essentials Evert Cup
Newsweek Champions Cup And The Matrix Essentials Evert Cup
Newsweek Champions Cup and the Matrix Essentials Evert Cup
Newsweek Champions Cup And The Matrix Essentials Evert Cup